The 1968 Torneo Descentralizado was the 52nd season of the highest division of Peruvian football. Carlos A. Mannucci of Trujillo made its debut in the first division in this season.

Sporting Cristal and Juan Aurich were tied on points at the end of the season. An extra match was played to determine first place and consequently the champion of the season. Sporting Cristal won the play-off and became national champions.

At the bottom of the league, Centro Iqueño and Mariscal Sucre tied on points, sharing thirteenth and fourteenth place. They also played an extra match to determine the team to face relegation. Centro Iqueño won the relegation play-off and Mariscal Sucre were relegated from the division. Carlos A. Mannucci were relegated as the worst placed team outside Lima and Callao.

Teams

League table

First place play-off

Thirteenth/fourteenth place play-off

External links
Peru 1968 season at RSSSF

1968 Torneo Descentralizado
Peru